Euryattus is a genus of spiders in the family Salticidae (jumping spiders).

Like Holcolaetis and Thiania bhamoensis, these spiders build a flat, densely woven egg sac that is not contiguous with the silk of the nest. Euryattus posits the egg sac in rolled up leaves, similar to T. bhamoensis, which is in the same subfamily and stitches two leaves together.

Etymology
The genus name is a compound of Ancient Greek eury "wide" and the common salticid ending -attus.

Species
, the World Spider Catalog accepted the following species:
 Euryattus bleekeri (Doleschall, 1859) – Sri Lanka to Queensland
 Euryattus breviusculus (Simon, 1902) – Sri Lanka
 Euryattus celebensis (Merian, 1911) – Sulawesi
 Euryattus junxiae Prószyński & Deeleman-Reinhold, 2010 – Sumbawa
 Euryattus kinabalus Prószyński & Deeleman-Reinhold, 2013 – Borneo
 Euryattus koomeni Prószyński & Deeleman-Reinhold, 2013 – Borneo
 Euryattus leopoldi (Roewer, 1938) – New Guinea, Aru Islands
 Euryattus myiopotami (Thorell, 1881) – New Guinea
 Euryattus pengi Prószyński & Deeleman-Reinhold, 2013 – Borneo
 Euryattus porcellus Thorell, 1881 – New Guinea
 Euryattus pumilio (Keyserling, 1881) – Queensland
 Euryattus ventralis Prószyński & Deeleman-Reinhold, 2013 – New Guinea
 Euryattus venustus (Doleschall, 1859) – Amboina, New Guinea
 Euryattus wallacei (Thorell, 1881) – Queensland

References

External links
 Photograph of E. bleekeri (?)

Salticidae
Salticidae genera
Spiders of Asia
Spiders of Australia